Vincent Morrison Brennan (April 22, 1890 – February 4, 1959) was a politician from the U.S. state of Michigan. He served one term in the United States House of Representatives from 1921 to 1923.

Early life and education
Brennan was born in Mount Clemens, Michigan and moved with his parents to Detroit in 1895. He graduated from SS. Peter and Paul's Parochial School, then from Detroit College in 1909, from the law department of Harvard University in 1912, and from the University of Detroit in 1914. He was admitted to the bar in 1912 and commenced practice in Detroit.

He was legal adviser to the Michigan State Labor Department in 1912 and 1913; assistant corporation counsel for the city of Detroit 1915–1920; member of the Michigan State Senate from the 2nd District in 1919 and 1920. He drafted the automobile traffic ordinance of Detroit, used as a model for many other cities.  He was also a Catholic and a member of the National Lawyers Guild, Knights of Columbus, and Delta Theta Phi

Tenure in Congress
Brennan was elected as a Republican to the United States House of Representatives from Michigan's 13th congressional district for the 67th Congress, serving from March 4, 1921, to March 3, 1923.  He was not a candidate for reelection in 1922.  Brennan introduced a bill in 1922, the first that proposed to allow radio coverage of U.S. House of Representatives proceedings. The bill failed, and the idea was not revived until the 1940s.

After Congress
After leaving Congress, he was elected judge of the circuit court of Wayne County, for the term commencing in January 1924 and was reelected for six successive terms, serving until his resignation effective December 31, 1954.  He then practiced law until his death in Detroit.  He is interred in Holy Sepulchre Cemetery in Southfield, Michigan.

References

The Political Graveyard

External links 

1890 births
1959 deaths
Burials in Michigan
People from Mount Clemens, Michigan
University of Detroit Mercy alumni
Harvard Law School alumni
Lawyers from Detroit
Republican Party Michigan state senators
Michigan state court judges
Republican Party members of the United States House of Representatives from Michigan
20th-century American judges
20th-century American lawyers
20th-century American politicians